Neu-Ems Castle ( or Schloss Glopper) is a medieval castle in Hohenems in the province of Vorarlberg, Austria. It was the fortification of the nobility Herren von Ems (Lords of Ems).

Location
The castle is in the mountainside east of the town, in its mountain village Emsreute on a crest above the Rhine valley.

History 
Approved by Emperor Louis IV the Bavarian, Ritter Ulrich I. von Ems (Knight Ulrich I of Ems) in 1343 built a new castle to have a comfortable home for his large family in dangerous times. He placed it near his fortress Alt-Ems on a hilltop.

During the Appenzell Wars in 1407 the castle was destroyed and rebuilt shortly afterwards.

In 1603 a chapel was assembled to the ground floor. Except two lancet windows in the northern wall there is nothing left over of it today. Since 1835 the former winged altar of this chapel is exhibited in the Tyrolean State Museum in Innsbruck.

Since 1843 the stronghold is privately owned by the family Waldburg-Zeil.

See also
 List of castles in Austria

References

External links
Website of Hohenems: Schloss Glopper or Neu-Ems

Castles in Vorarlberg